Pseudoradiarctia is a genus of moths in the family Erebidae from Afrotropics.

Species
 Pseudoradiarctia affinis (Bartel, 1903)
 Pseudoradiarctia lentifasciata (Hampson, 1916)
 Pseudoradiarctia pallida Haynes, 2011
 Pseudoradiarctia parva Haynes, 2011
 Pseudoradiarctia rhodesiana (Hampson, 1900)
 Pseudoradiarctia scita (Walker, [1865])
 Pseudoradiarctia tanzanica Haynes, 2011

References
 , 2011: A review of some of the Binna-like species of Afrotropical Spilosoma Curtis (1825) listed by Goodger & Watson (1995) and including the genus Radiarctia Dubatolov (2006) (Lepidoptera: Arctiidae, Arctiinae). Zootaxa 2811: 22-36.
Natural History Museum Lepidoptera generic names catalog

Spilosomina
Moth genera